Juan José Plans Martínez (February 28, 1943, Gijón, Asturias - February 24, 2014, Gijón, Asturias) was a Spanish writer, journalist, and radio and television announcer. He specialized as a writer in fantasy, horror, and science fiction, and published several collections of short stories and several radio and TV adaptations of classics in these genres. He was the author of nearly forty books and is on over thirty national and international anthologies, which have been translated into Portuguese, Polish, French, Russian and English.

His novel El juego de los niños (roughly meaning Children's Game) has been adapted for film twice: first as Narciso Ibáñez Serrador's Who Can Kill a Child? and later as Come Out and Play.

Of the asociación jovellanista, he has written biographies of Gaspar Melchor de Jovellanos and Alejandro Casona.

He was the father of painter Edgar Plans Pérez (b. 1977, in Madrid) who is author of the 2009 Feria Internacional de Muestras de Asturias (Asturias International Trade Fair) poster.

Career
Plans started his career in the press, in collaboration with Gijón's El Comercio and the Oviedo provincial press. In 1965, he moved to Madrid. There he began working at Spanish National Radio, as editor of La Estafeta Literaria and as editorial adviser of El Basilisco and Nickel Odeón. He led the Centro Territorial de TVE (Spanish Television Regional Headquarters) in Asturias, from 1984 to 1988, and also the Gijón International Film Festival.

He was the Spain director of the monthly magazine Lui.

He collaborated in the cultural supplement of La Nueva España, an Oviedo periodical, and picked up some of the articles from Puzzle 90 and Puzzle 91, 1990 through 1991. He presented, between 1994 and 2003, the radio shows Sobrenatural and Historias, on Spanish National Radio.

He has been awarded the  National Theater Prize. He received the 1972 Premio Nacional de Guion Radiofónico (National Radio Broadcasting Script Prize) for Ventana al futuro and the  Ondas Awards of 1982 for España y los españoles, both programs of Spanish National Radio. He obtained the Premio de las Letras de Asturias (Asturias Letters Prize) in 2010.

Works
Alejandro Casona. Juego biográfico dividido en una raíz y tres árboles, 1965 and 1990 — biography of Alejandro Casona
Las langostas, 1967
Crónicas fantásticas, 1968
La gran coronación, 1968
Historia de la novela policiaca, 1970
Los misterios del castillo, 1971
El cadáver, 1973
Paraíso Final, 1975
La literatura de ciencia-ficción, Prensa española - Magisterio español, 1975
El juego de los niños, 1976
Babel Dos, 1979
De noche, un sábado, 1979
El último suelo, 1986
Lobos, 1990
Puzzle 90, Oviedo: Pentalfa. 1990 — articles
Puzzle 91, Oviedo: Pentalfa. 1991 — articles
Pasión de Drácula, Nickel Odeón Dos, 1993
Cuentos crueles, 1995
Jovellanos, 1996 — biography of Gaspar Melchor de Jovellanos
La leyenda de Tsobu, 1996 — novel
En busca de Sharon, 1997 — novel
Cromos de películas, Nickel Odeon, 2003

Anthologies
  Horror stories by Alfredo Álamo, Matías Candeira, Santiago Eximeno, Cristina Fernández Cubas, David Jasso, José María Latorre, Alberto López Aroca, Lorenzo Luengo, Ángel Olgoso, Félix Palma, Pilar Pedraza, Juan José Plans, Miguel Puente, Marc R. Soto, Norberto Luis Romero, Care Santos, José Carlos Somoza, José María Tamparillas, David Torres, José Miguel Vilar-Bou and Marian Womack.

See also
 Radio drama

References

1943 births
2014 deaths
People from Asturias
Writers from Asturias
Colegio de la Inmaculada (Gijón) alumni
People from Gijón
Spanish radio writers
Spanish journalists